Ultimate Collection is a compilation album released by English singer Rick Astley in 2008. It contains the song "Full of You," considered previously unreleased as it only appears on the Germany album Keep It Turned On. The album reached #17 on the UK Album Chart.

Track listing
"Never Gonna Give You Up"
"Together Forever" (Lover's Leap Remix)
"My Arms Keep Missing You" (The "Where's Harry?" Remix)
"Whenever You Need Somebody" (7" Version)
"She Wants to Dance with Me" (Watermix)
"When I Fall in Love"
"Cry for Help"
"Take Me to Your Heart"
"It Would Take a Strong Strong Man"
"Hold Me in Your Arms"
"Hopelessly"
"Move Right Out"
"The Ones You Love" (Edit)
"Never Knew Love" (Remix)
"Body and Soul"
"Vincent"
"Full of You"

External links
Ultimate Collection News

Rick Astley compilation albums
2008 compilation albums